Kazuhiro Miyashita (宮下和広, Miyashita Kazuhiro, born 6 August 1961) is a Japanese former handball player who competed in the 1988 Summer Olympics.

References

1961 births
Living people
Japanese male handball players
Olympic handball players of Japan
Handball players at the 1988 Summer Olympics
Asian Games medalists in handball
Handball players at the 1986 Asian Games
Handball players at the 1990 Asian Games
Asian Games silver medalists for Japan
Asian Games bronze medalists for Japan
Medalists at the 1986 Asian Games
Medalists at the 1990 Asian Games
20th-century Japanese people